William Earnest Green (February 28, 1925, Kansas City, Kansas - July 29, 1996, Los Angeles) was an American jazz multi-instrumentalist.

Green learned to play alto saxophone at age ten and picked up clarinet when he was twelve; he eventually learned to play most varieties of saxophone, clarinet, and flute. He served in the military until 1946, then began working at a club called Small's in Kansas City. In 1947 he relocated to Los Angeles and enrolled at the Los Angeles Conservatory of Music and Arts, graduating in 1952; he remained on staff as an educator there until 1962. He also ran a music education studio on La Brea Avenue in Los Angeles for many years.

He played early in his career with Gerald Wilson, and began working with Benny Carter in the latter half of the 1950s. From 1959 to 1962 he played in Louie Bellson's big band, and worked extensively as a section player in the bands of musicians such as Quincy Jones, Henry Mancini, and Buddy Rich; he also accompanied vocalists such as Frank Sinatra, Tony Bennett, Nat King Cole, Nancy Wilson, and Dionne Warwick. He played the Monterey Jazz Festival with Gil Fuller in 1965, and worked with Oliver Nelson in 1966 and Blue Mitchell in 1969. In the 1970s he performed or recorded with Gene Ammons, the Capp-Pierce Juggernaut, Ella Fitzgerald, Sonny Rollins, and Sarah Vaughan. He continued working with the Capp-Pierce orchestra in the early 1980s, as well as with Lionel Hampton, Woody Herman, and the Clayton-Hamilton Jazz Orchestra.
Green also appeared as the pianist on Episode 33 Season 6 of Bonanza, as well as a street musician in Episode 7 Season 4 of The Golden Girls.

Green's personal papers and recordings are held in an archive at UCLA.

Discography

Shades of Green (Everest, 1963) as William Green & The Marty Jazz All Stars

With Benny Carter
Aspects (United Artists, 1959)

With Buddy Collette
Man of Many Parts (Contemporary, 1957)

With Fred Katz
Soul° Cello (Decca, 1958)

With Louis Bellson
Big Band Jazz from the Summit (Roulette, 1962)

With Quincy Jones
 Roots (A&M, 1977)

With others
 Dingo (Warner Bros., 1991) with Miles Davis and Michel Legrand

References
 Steven L. Isoardi, "Bill Green". The New Grove Dictionary of Jazz. 2nd edition, ed. Barry Kernfeld.

1925 births
1996 deaths
American jazz saxophonists
American male saxophonists
American jazz clarinetists
American jazz flautists
Musicians from Kansas City, Kansas
20th-century American saxophonists
20th-century American male musicians
American male jazz musicians
The Capp-Pierce Juggernaut members
20th-century flautists